Krippendorf-Dittman Company is a registered historic building in Cincinnati, Ohio, listed in the National Register on March 3, 1980.

Formerly the Krippendorf-Dittman Shoe Company factory, the building has been converted to Sycamore Place luxury loft apartments. The street level retail space presently holds the Sycamore Gallery art collection of University of Cincinnati College of Design, Architecture, Art, and Planning.

Notes 

National Register of Historic Places in Cincinnati
Industrial buildings and structures on the National Register of Historic Places in Ohio
Cincinnati Local Historic Landmarks